The men's 800 metres competition at the 1968 Summer Olympics in Mexico City, Mexico. The event were held at the University Olympic Stadium on October 13–15. Forty-four athletes from 32 nations competed. The maximum number of athletes per nation had been set at 3 since the 1930 Olympic Congress. The event was won by Ralph Doubell of Australia, the nation's second title in the men's 800 metres—and its first medal in the event since its first title in 1896. Wilson Kiprugut of Kenya improved on his 1964 bronze to take silver, becoming the seventh man to win a second medal in the 800 metres. Tom Farrell's bronze put the United States back on the podium for the first time since 1956.

Background

This was the 16th appearance of the event, which is one of 12 athletics events to have been held at every Summer Olympics. Three finalists from 1964 returned: bronze medalist Wilson Kiprugut of Kenya, fourth-place finisher Tom Farrell of the United States, and eighth-place finisher Jacques Pennewaert of Belgium. American Wade Bell, the 1967 Pan American champion, was a favorite to challenge Kiprugut.

The Dominican Republic, El Salvador, Nicaragua, Senegal, and Sudan appeared in the event for the first time; East Germany and West Germany competed separately for the first time as well. Great Britain and the United States each made their 15th appearance, tied for the most among all nations.

Summary
Kiprugut took the race out fast from the gun. Running from lane 6, he it the break line with a 1 metre lead on Ben Cayenne, but the rest of the field was 3 more metres back. Dieter Fromm pushed the first backstretch to get back in contact with the two frontrunners, with teenager Jozef Plachý in tow.  Ralph Doubell found himself in dead last place from the fast start, but weaved his way through to fifth place on the backstretch, then ran the outside of the lane to get to Plachý's shoulder. The field tightened up during the first homestretch, Kiprugut still in the lead at the bell in 50.98. Through the penultimate turn, Kiprugut separated off the front again, Cayenne fell back through the field. Again on the backstretch, worked hard to regain contact with Kiprugut, bringing Doubell with him still on the outside of the lane. As Plachý and the rest of the field slowed, Farrell came from next to last at the bell to fourth place. Entering the final turn, Doubell got past Fromm and onto the rail still 4 metres behind Kiprugut. With a 5 metre gap back to Fromm, it was a two man race to the finish, Doubell sprinting to chase the tiring Kiprugut. 50 metres from the finish, Doubell eased by Kiprugut on the outside.  Ten metres behind them, Farrell went past Fromm with Walter Adams chasing. Kiprugut chased Doubell all the way to the line, Doubell taking a 1 metre victory. Adams couldn't catch Farrell and gave up the chase, gliding across the finish.

Doubell's time equalled Peter Snell's world record (hand timed), while both Doubell and Kiprugut had beaten Snell's Olympic record. Farrell was the first American medalist since the four in a row winning streak 1936-1956.  Save Dave Wottle's victory the following Olympics, USA has only won four more bronze medals after Farrell.

Competition format

The competition used the three-round format that had been in use for most Games since 1912. The event had seven heats in the first round, two semifinals and a final. The top two in each of the first round heats progressed, as did the four fastest non-qualifiers. The top four finishers in each semifinal race reached the finals.

Records

Prior to the competition, the existing World and Olympic records were as follows.

Ralph Doubell and Wilson Kiprugut both ran under the Olympic record in the final, with Doubell finishing in 1:44.3 to equal the world record.

Schedule

All times are Central Standard Time (UTC-6)

Results

Round 1
Qual. rule: first 2 of each heat (Q) plus the 4 fastest times (q) qualified.

Heat 1

Heat 2

Heat 3

Heat 4

Heat 5

Heat 6

Semifinals

Qual. rule: first 4 of each heat (Q) qualified.

Semifinal 1

Semifinal 2

Final

References

External links
 Official Olympic Report, la84foundation.org. Retrieved August 13, 2012.

Athletics at the 1968 Summer Olympics
800 metres at the Olympics
Men's events at the 1968 Summer Olympics